Auriculariopsis albomellea is a species of fungus belonging to the family Schizophyllaceae.

It is native to Eurasia.

References

Schizophyllaceae